Anisa or Anieca is the feminine form of the Arabic name Anis. People with the name include:
 Anisa Angarola, American guitarist
 Anisa Butt (born 1993), British-Indian actress
 Anisa Hajimumin (born 1978), Somali American politician
 Anisa Kospiri (born 1980), Miss Universe Albania
 Anisa Makhlouf (1930–2016), first lady of Syria
 Anisa Mohammed (born 1988), Trinidadian cricketer
 Anisa Petrova (born 1970), Uzbekistani fencer
 Anisa Rasooli (born 1969), Afghan judge